Nea Malgara is a village and a community of the Delta municipality. Before the 2011 local government reform it was part of the municipality of Axios, of which it was a municipal district. The 2011 census recorded 2,404 inhabitants in the village. The community of Nea Malgara covers an area of 42.22 km2.

See also
 List of settlements in the Thessaloniki regional unit

References

Populated places in Thessaloniki (regional unit)